In Greek mythology, Thaumacus (Ancient Greek: Θαυμάκου) was the founder of Thaumacia in Magnesia, Thessaly. He was the father of King Poeas of Meliboea or Malis, the father of Philoctetes.

Notes

References 

 Pseudo-Apollodorus, The Library with an English Translation by Sir James George Frazer, F.B.A., F.R.S. in 2 Volumes, Cambridge, MA, Harvard University Press; London, William Heinemann Ltd. 1921. . Online version at the Perseus Digital Library. Greek text available from the same website.
Stephanus of Byzantium, Stephani Byzantii Ethnicorum quae supersunt, edited by August Meineike (1790-1870), published 1849. A few entries from this important ancient handbook of place names have been translated by Brady Kiesling. Online version at the Topos Text Project.

Thessalian characters in Greek mythology